Withdrawal Method, originally titled Vagina Dentata, is the second and final studio album by American alternative rock band Die Monster Die, released in 1994 by Roadrunner Records. The album was recorded during October 1993 at RPM Studios in New York City with producer Steven Haigler, except for the track "Slumber" which was engineered by Ray Martin at Shelter Island. Withdrawal Method like their debut studio album, Chrome Molly (1993), failed to chart. Two singles were released from the album: "Slumber" and "Barknuckle", both of which also failed to chart.

Critical reception

In a retrospective review for AllMusic, critic Eduardo Rivadavia wrote of the album, "no matter how hard it tries to be eclectic, Withdrawal Method never once breaks into truly uncharted territory, and if not for the haunting innocence of Alice Cohen's girlish croons, there'd be nothing memorable about the album."

Track listing
All songs are written by Die Monster Die.

Side one
"Barknuckle" – 3:12
"Swallowed" – 3:33
"Wallflower Garden" – 2:54
"Slumber" – 3:51
"Toad" – 3:56
"Teeth" – 3:14

Side two
"Vagina Dentata" – 4:31
"Sympathy" – 3:38
"Cadmium Oscuro" – 4:37
"Wip" – 0:32
"Bones" – 2:15
"Pennies" – 4:59
"Portrait" – 3:55

Personnel
Credits are adapted from the Withdrawal Method liner notes.
 Alice Cohen – vocals; bass guitar; organ
 Evan Player – guitar; bass guitar
 Kenny Sanders – drums; vocals
 Shawn Tracy – guitar
 Jane Scarpantoni – cello 
 Joe McGinty – vibraphone 

Production and artwork
 Steven Haigler – producer; engineer
 Ray Martin – engineer 
 Julio Paulino Peralta – assistant engineer
 Greg Calbi – mastering engineer
 LMD – design; type collage
 Mark Garland – artwork
 Alice Cohen – lyric page collage
 Karen Kuehn – photography

Note on the band name
Since this Die Monster Die's breakup, another band called DieMonsterDie was founded in Utah; they are unrelated.

References

External links

1994 albums
Roadrunner Records albums